The East Yorkshire Family History Society (EYFHS) is an English family history society covering the East Riding of Yorkshire and parts of North Yorkshire.  It was founded in 1977 and had 1,410 members in 2010. It is a member of the Federation of Family History Societies. and a registered charity, no. 519743.

The society is active in the preservation of local and family history resources and making those resources available to fellow researchers world-wide.  To date, the EYFHS has produced in excess of three hundred book-based resources including monumental inscriptions, parish registers, census indexes and research guides.  More recently, it has extended its 'traditional' publishing activities by introducing an ever-growing range of electronic publications and resources.

The Society publishes an award-winning quarterly journal, The Banyan Tree, and has research facilities at Scarborough and Hull. Its Research Centre in Hull is based at the grade II listed Carnegie Heritage Centre, a former public library opened in 1905, at the gates of West Park, Hull.

Regular meetings are held in Hull and Scarborough.  Members of the Society have access to research resources, physical and online, and advice services.

References

Examples of publications
Monumental inscriptions:  Bridlington Cemetery : monumental inscriptions. Part three. (2011)) 
Parish Register Transcription series: Mariners Church, Hull : baptisms February 1856 to March 1925. (2011) OCLC 689005498
Miscellaneous Publications series: J A R Bickford and M E Bickford: East Riding medical men (2007) OCLC 244985296

External links
EYFHS web site.

Family history societies in the United Kingdom
Clubs and societies in England
Organisations based in the East Riding of Yorkshire